The phi complex is a brain rhythm in the awake human brain that appears to serve various social functions. Phi is one of several brain rhythms in the awake human brain that coordinate human behavior. "Phi" operates in the 10-Hz band (ten oscillations per second), and is located above the right centro-parietal cortex. It consists of two components, one favoring independent behaviors, and the other favoring interpersonal coordination between people.

The brain wave patterns of the phi complex are consistent with those of waves produced in the human mirror neuron system. The phi complex may reflect the influence of one person upon another's behavior, with phi-1 expressing the inhibition of the human mirror neuron system and phi-2 its enhancement.

Research
Researchers from Florida Atlantic University (FAU), in one of the first studies in the field of social neuroscience, have identified neural signatures of effective, real-time coordination between people. FAU researchers have recorded, measured and analyzed both behavior and brain activity simultaneously in two interacting humans that could provide insight into neurological disorders, such as autism and schizophrenia. The research used the conceptual framework and methods of coordination dynamics.

Using specially designed dual-electroencephalogram recordings, Tognoli and her colleagues tested the brain activity of two people simultaneously performing continuous finger motion. Initially, two subjects were asked to rhythmically wag their fingers at their own preferential pace, but were prevented from seeing each other's hands. Then the barrier placed between them was then removed, so they could see each other while continuing to wag their fingers. When subjects were allowed to see one another's fingers moving, they sometimes adjusted their own movements and synchronized, and sometimes they did not, behaving independently.

The researchers believe that the use of dual EEG recordings to observe the phi complex could help scientists better understand what triggers leader/follower behaviors and male/female relationships. The researchers reported that 62% of respondents synchronized their movements upon being exposed to one another's finger-wagging, but 38% were unaffected and continued gesturing independently.

The study demonstrated a clear reduction in occipital lobe alpha wave and mu wave rhythms during social interaction. The evident suppression was independent of whether or not behavior was coordinated. In contrast, a pair of oscillatory components (phi-1 and phi-2) above the right centro-parietal cortex distinguished effective from ineffective coordination. An increase of phi-1 favored independent behavior and increase of phi-2 favored coordinated behavior.

According to Kelso "What this research suggests is that a unique pattern can be seen in the brains of two people interacting and that these brain activities distinguish independence from cooperation. This new brain rhythm that we have discovered and termed the 'phi complex' actually distinguishes when you're socially interacting and when you're not."

See also
 Beta wave 
 Delta wave
 Epilepsy
 Holonomic brain theory
 SMR
 Sensory processing disorder
 Theta wave

References

Electroencephalography
Electrophysiology
Human behavior
Neurophysiology
Neurotechnology
Medical tests